William Taramai (born April 23, 1961) is a middle-distance athlete, who competed for the Cook Islands.

Taramai competed at the 1988 Summer Olympics in the 800 metres, where he finished 8th in his heat so failed to qualify for the next round.

References

External links
 

1961 births
Living people
Athletes (track and field) at the 1988 Summer Olympics
Cook Island male middle-distance runners
Olympic athletes of the Cook Islands